The 2015 Women's World Draughts Championship at the international draughts was held May 11–24, 2015 in Wuhan, China International Draughts Federation FMJD. Sixteen female players in total will be competing in the tournament. The tournament started on May 11, 2015, and will end on May 24, 2015. It will be played as a round-robin, with 15 rounds in total, each of which be micro-match from two games. The winning prize for the tournament is 20,000 euros.

Natalia Sadowska (Poland) won the right to become a candidate in the match for the title Women's World Draughts Champions with Zoja Golubeva (Latvia).

Participants
The sixteen participants are nominated according to a schema and rules accepted by the FMJD General Assembly:

Reserve players

Rules and regulations
The games will be played in the official FMJD time rate of the Fischer system with 1 hour and 20 minutes for the game plus 1 minute per move. Conforming to the FMJD regulations players are not allowed to agree on a draw before they both made 40 moves. If they do so nevertheless, the referee is obliged to decide on a 0-point each players.

The final classification will be based on the total points obtained. If two or more players will have same total points to define the places:

1. the largest number of victories

2. the best results between this players

3. the best results obtained in order of the classification.

Results

See also
List of women's Draughts World Championship winners
Women's World Draughts Championship

References

External links
World Championship Women 2015 Wu Han, China. May 2015
FMJD – WCWomen 2015. Rules & Regulations
Official website
Results 

2015 in draughts
Draughts world championships
Sport in Wuhan
2015 in Chinese sport
International sports competitions hosted by China